Yarem Tappeh (also Romanized as Yārem Tappeh) is a village in Tamran Rural District, in the Central District of Kalaleh County, Golestan Province, Iran. At the 2006 census, its population was 650, in 121 families.

References 

Populated places in Kalaleh County